Paralympic powerlifting, also known as para powerlifting and para-lifting, is an adaptation of the sport of powerlifting for athletes with disabilities. The only discipline in Paralympic powerlifting is the bench press. The sport is governed by the International Paralympic Committee (World Para Powerlifting) and is open to anyone with a minimum level of disability who can extend their arms within 20° of full extension during a lift. Powerlifting has been competed at the Summer Paralympics since 1984.

Events 
Events:

Global 
 Powerlifting at the Summer Paralympics since 1984.
 World Para Powerlifting Championships since 1994.
 World Para Powerlifting World Cup (WPPO World Cup) since 2015.
 Fazaa International Powerlifting Competition since 2009. (2013 not held)

Regional 
2013, 2015, 2018. (IPC Powerlifting Open ... Championships)
 World Para Powerlifting European Open Championships since 2013.
 World Para Powerlifting Asian Open Championships since 2013. (Asia-Oceania)
 World Para Powerlifting Americas Open Championships since 2015. (Pan American)
 World Para Powerlifting African Open Championships since 2015.

World Cup 
up to 2016: IPC Powerlifting World Cup

 2011 Mexican Powerlifting Competition
 2011 Polish Cup Powerlifting-Bydgoszcz
 2011 International Powerlifting Competition in Amman
 2011 3rd Powerlifting Khorfakkan International Competition
 2011 8th China National Games for the Disable
 2011 International Powerlifting Competition in Hungary
 IWAS World Games 2011, 2021
 2011 Malaysia Open Powerlifting Championships
 2013 Open Misr Cup Powerlifting Championships
 Glasgow 2014 Commonwealth Games

World records
World records in Paralympic powerlifting are ratified by the International Paralympic Committee.

Elite
Men

Women

Next Gen
Men

Women

Rookie
Men

Women

Legend
Men

Women

See also 
 List of Olympic records in weightlifting
 List of world records in Olympic weightlifting
 List of junior world records in Olympic weightlifting
 List of youth world records in Olympic weightlifting
 Progression of the bench press world record
 NFL Scouting Combine Bench press records
 Squat world records
 World record progression women's weightlifting
 World record progression women's weightlifting (1998–2018)
 World record progression men's weightlifting
 World record progression men's weightlifting (1998–2018)

References

External links
World Para Powerlifting
World Records
Weightlifting Platform

See also 
Powerlifting at the Summer Paralympics

 
Powerlifting